Kitchen Confidential may refer to:

 Kitchen Confidential (book), a non-fiction book by Anthony Bourdain
 Kitchen Confidential (TV series), a short-lived sitcom